Christoph Sieber (born 9 January 1971, in Wels) is an Austrian sailor who competed in the 2000 Summer Olympics. He won a gold medal in the Mistral class.

References

External links
 
 
 
 

1971 births
Living people
Austrian windsurfers
Austrian male sailors (sport)
Olympic sailors of Austria
Olympic gold medalists for Austria
Olympic medalists in sailing
Sailors at the 1992 Summer Olympics – Lechner A-390
Sailors at the 2000 Summer Olympics – Mistral One Design
Medalists at the 2000 Summer Olympics
Recipients of the Decoration of Honour for Services to the Republic of Austria
People from Wels
Sportspeople from Upper Austria